The Bald Mountain Wilderness is a  wilderness area in White Pine County, in the U.S. state of Nevada.  The Wilderness lies within the Humboldt-Toiyabe National Forest and is administered by the U.S. Forest Service.

Located in the heart of the White Pine Range, Bald Mountain Wilderness was created by the White Pine County Conservation, Recreation and Development Act of 2006.

See also 
 List of wilderness areas in Nevada
 List of U.S. Wilderness Areas
 Wilderness Act

References

External links 
 "Bald Mountain Wilderness". U.S. Forest Service.
 "Bald Mountain Wilderness". Wilderness.net.
 
 "Humboldt-Toiyabe National Forest". U.S. Forest Service.

Humboldt–Toiyabe National Forest
Wilderness areas of Nevada
Protected areas of White Pine County, Nevada